The 1909 Campeonato Carioca, the fourth edition of that championship, kicked off on May 2, 1909 and ended on October 31, 1909. It was organized by LMSA (Liga Metropolitana de Sports Athleticos, or Metropolitan Athletic Sports League). Seven teams participated. Fluminense won the title for the 4th time. No teams were relegated.

Participating teams

System 
The tournament would be disputed in a double round-robin format, with the team with the most points winning the title.

Championship

References 

Campeonato Carioca seasons
Carioca